New Violent Breed Volume 2 is a various artists compilation album released in April 2001 by COP International.

Reception
Elektronski Zvuk criticized New Violent Breed Volume 2 for not meeting the success of the previous entry and failing to provide new material of interest for the listener. StarVox Music Zine said the collection "represents the best that terror and noise industrial has to offer" and "stays on target the whole way through -- it has a definite musical theme, and all the tracks stick to it."

Track listing

Personnel
Adapted from the New Violent Breed Volume 2 liner notes.

 Guido Nockemann – photography
 Stefan "D-Core" Noltemeyer – mastering, design
 Christian Petke (as Count Zero) – compiling
 Matthew Vickerstaff – cover art, illustrations

Release history

References

External links 
 New Violent Breed Volume 2 at Discogs (list of releases)

2001 compilation albums
COP International compilation albums